Rapture is a fictional city in the BioShock series published by 2K Games. It is an underwater city that is the main setting for the games BioShock and BioShock 2. The city also briefly appears in BioShock Infinite, and is featured in its downloadable content, Burial at Sea. The game's back-story describes the city as envisioned by business tycoon Andrew Ryan in the mid-1940s as a means to create a utopia for mankind's greatest artists and thinkers to prosper in a laissez-faire environment outside of increasing oppression by the world's governments and religion. However, the lack of government made many people uneasy, and the masses turned toward political activists like Atlas who advocated stability under a government, turning the city into a dystopia; and on the eve of 1959, a civil war broke out, leaving much of Rapture's population dead. The remaining citizens either became psychotic "Splicers" due to the effects of ADAM, a substance that can alter genetic material, or have barricaded themselves from the Splicers to protect themselves, leaving the city to fail and fall apart around them.

The player first experiences Rapture in BioShock, in 1960, a year after the fateful riots, as a man named Jack that has come to Rapture after a plane accident over the mid-Atlantic Ocean where the city was located; during this, the player comes to learn more about Ryan's motives and those that he struggled against to keep the city's ideals until the very end. In BioShock 2, the player takes the role of a "Big Daddy", a heavily modified humanoid in an armored diving suit, designed to maintain the city, and would soon come to serve the purpose of protecting the Little Sisters as they collect ADAM from "Angels", which are dead bodies that harbor significant amounts of ADAM; this takes place eight years after the events of the first game, and while Ryan has been killed, there remain those that vie for the vacuum left in his position of power.

Rapture makes a brief appearance near the climax of BioShock Infinite, which is otherwise set in a different dystopian city, Columbia. Downloadable content for Infinite is set in Rapture on New Year's Eve 1959, a year before the events of the first BioShock and on the day of the civil war.

Concept and creation 

The concept of Rapture was the brainchild of Ken Levine, founding member and creative director of Irrational Games, (briefly renamed 2K Boston just prior to BioShocks release, but later returned to their former name). Ken Levine had studied the works of Ayn Rand, George Orwell, and Aldous Huxley and other works of utopian and dystopian societies as part of his liberal arts degree. He had also had fascination with the story of Logan's Run. Levine also considered the nature of the horror genre, noting works such as The Shining where there is the need for a feeling of loss for the horror to be effective. Rapture's Art Deco architecture was heavily inspired by the locations and buildings of New York City, like the Rockefeller Center. Gotham City from the Batman universe also served as inspiration. Shawn Robertson stated that Art Deco fit really well into BioShock's budget, as the finished Art Deco models had large and simple solid shapes and were low poly. Rapture features a vast number of various artwork, and advertisements for businesses within the city, which many were inspired by real-world vintage advertisements.

Description 

Rapture is an underwater city, located in the north Atlantic Ocean somewhere between Greenland and Iceland. It is only accessible by a system of bathyspheres. The city was designed to be self-sufficient, growing and raising its own crops as well as using the surrounding sea life for food, and taking advantage of submarine volcanoes to provide geothermal power to its population. The city consists of many "skyscrapers", inter-linked by walkways and tunnels, with watertight doors between neighboring sections to isolate areas from the rest of the city should they ever become flooded. The buildings, both inside and out, feature a distinctive Art Deco design motif, reflecting on the era during which they were built (the mid-'40s). In addition to living quarters, Rapture features shopping areas, entertainment venues, laboratories, manufacturing plants, medical facilities, and other common services provided by a functional city.

Though Rapture was built as a utopia for creative individuals to flourish, the city soon became a dystopia. Part of the downfall of Rapture was the discovery of ADAM, stem cells harvested from a previously unknown species of sea slug. Scientists in Rapture found that ADAM could be used to overwrite the human genome, allowing its users to literally "splice" super powers (such as telekinesis) into their DNA. The lead scientist, Dr. Brigid Tenenbaum, discovered that ADAM could be mass-produced by implanting the sea slug in the stomachs of young orphaned girls, who came to be known as "Little Sisters". The implantation process only worked on female children for an unknown reason. As Rapture began to fall into social chaos, in part due to the mental instability that came about from increased ADAM use, the Little Sisters were mentally reconditioned to extract ADAM from the dead and recycle it. In order to protect the girls from ADAM-hungry lunatics, Dr. Suchong generated genetically modified humans in armored diving suits, and assigned them to protect a specific Little Sister. These beings became known as "Big Daddies".

When the player experiences the city, roughly one/ten years after the collapse of its society (one year in BioShock, ten years in BioShock 2), the majority of Rapture's population is dead; the few that survive have either become psychotic "Splicers", or survivors that have barricaded themselves from the Splicers. While most of the city's automated systems still operate, large swaths of the city have become flooded, while others have been damaged beyond repair, either as a result of the bloody civil war that tore Rapture apart, or as a consequence of the Splicers' ADAM-induced psychotic episodes. ADAM harvesting Little Sisters, accompanied by their Big Daddy protectors, continue to wander Rapture during the player's experiences in the city.

History 

Rapture was formally founded on November 5, 1946.

As described in the games' backstory and through in-game audio recordings, the city of Rapture was envisioned by the Randian business magnate Andrew Ryan, who wanted to create a laissez-faire state with no ties to the rest of the world to escape what he saw as increasingly oppressive political, economic, and religious authority on land. The city was fully completed in 1951. Scientific progress flourished in Rapture, leading to rapid developments in engineering and biotechnology, such as the invention of ADAM, thanks in part to the brilliant scientists that Ryan brought to the city.

Though residents were hand-picked for their success on the surface, as time passed, the gap between rich and poor increased. This was exploited by Frank Fontaine, a businessman in charge of the plasmid industry who secretly established an illegal smuggling ring with the outside world while simultaneously creating charitable organizations to manipulate the underclass. A violent attempt to overthrow Ryan reportedly killed Fontaine, but the player's experience in BioShock reveals that Fontaine survived, disguising himself as the proletarian hero 'Atlas'. On New Year's Eve of 1959, Fontaine/Atlas and his ADAM-infused followers began a new revolt against Ryan, targeting a masquerade party hosted by the city-famous Kashmir Restaurant, that spread throughout Rapture. Ryan in turn began splicing his own forces, and his paranoia had reached such a level he was hanging dozens of people, mostly innocent, in Rapture's Apollo Square. As the war disrupted production and supply, every ADAM user in the city eventually went violently insane. By the end of the 1959 revolt, Ryan's utopia had become a dystopia, and only a handful of non-mutated humans survive in barricaded hideouts.

In the events of BioShock, Jack, the player-controlled protagonist, ends up in Rapture after a plane crash in the middle of the ocean leaves him close to the city's bathysphere surface terminus. In the course of the game, it is learned that Jack is Ryan's illegitimate son, and was purposely brought to Rapture to be used as a cat's paw against the founder by Fontaine/Atlas. When Jack finally meets Ryan, the latter is well aware of Jack's identity and mental conditioning, and orders Jack to kill him, ending his life on his own terms and rejecting the control Fontaine has over his son. Fontaine leaves Jack to die, but he is rescued by Tenenbaum and her Little Sisters, and together they attack and kill Fontaine.

In the power void left by the deaths of Ryan's and Fontaine, a previously disgraced public figure named Sofia Lamb seizes power in the following decade. In contrast to Ryan's belief of empowering the individual, Lamb's ideals are favoring the collective, and she is able to build "The Family", a cult-like following of the remaining citizens of Rapture to achieve her goals. During the events of BioShock 2 (which takes place ten years after the events of the first game), the player takes the role of the first prototype Big Daddy, Subject Delta, as Lamb's plans progress to their final completion to extend The Family to the surface. The destinies of Delta, Lamb, and Eleanor, Lamb's daughter and Delta's original Little Sister, are determined by the player's action during the game, though the endings involve escaping a section of Rapture flooded by Lamb. The fate of Rapture is left open after the completion of the game.

More details about the origins of Rapture are provided in the novel BioShock: Rapture, a prequel novel by John Shirley, released in 2011. The novel tells the backstory of the creation of Rapture, the underwater city's deterioration, and the civil war following the coming of plasmids. The novel ends shortly before the story in the first BioShock game begins. The novel was originally called BioShock: the Rise and Fall of the Ryan Empire.

The Burial at Sea downloadable content expansion for Bioshock Infinite explores a series of events that lead to the Rapture civil war. The story follows Elizabeth as she approaches Booker DeWitt, who works as a private investigator in Rapture, to investigate the disappearance of a young girl named Sally. Elizabeth claims that Sally is alive, and that a local artist named Sander Cohen may have information regarding her whereabouts. Throughout the course of the DLC, many details surrounding Atlas' rebellion, the link between Rapture and the floating city of Columbia, and the origin of the bond between Big Daddies and Little Sisters are revealed.

Reception 

In reviews for BioShock, many reviewers praised the representation of Rapture. Charles Herold of The New York Times wrote that the city was "a fascinating creation" and that there was something "both wonderful and disturbing" in exploring the ruins of Andrew Ryan's creation.

Notes

References

Further reading
 
 
 
 

BioShock (series)
Abandoned buildings and structures in fiction
Dystopian fiction
Fictional city-states
Underwater civilizations in fiction
Video game levels
Video game locations
Fictional elements introduced in 2007